Thornwell is an unincorporated community in Jefferson Davis Parish, Louisiana, United States.

Unincorporated communities in Jefferson Davis Parish, Louisiana
Unincorporated communities in Louisiana